Sphenella rostrata is a species of tephritid or fruit flies in the genus Sphenella of the family Tephritidae.

It is endemic to Lesotho.

References

Tephritinae
Insects described in 1957
Diptera of Africa